Sergio Álvarez may refer to:
 Sergio Álvarez (sport shooter) (born 1948), Cuban Olympic sport shooter
 Sergio Álvarez Mata (born 1962), Mexican politician
 Sergio Álvarez (weightlifter) (born 1979), Cuban weightlifter
 Sergio Álvarez (footballer, born 1986), Spanish footballer
 Sergio Álvarez (footballer, born 1992), Spanish footballer